East End Football Club are a Scottish football club from the city of Aberdeen. Members of the Scottish Junior Football Association, they currently play in the SJFA North Superleague. The club is based at New Advocates Park, 500 metres from Pittodrie Stadium, home of Aberdeen. Their home kit colours are black and gold.

The team have been managed since November 2018 by Stuart Whicher.

Honours
 North East Premier Division winners: 1977–78
 North Regional Cup (North Champions): 1977–78
 Aberdeen & District Junior League winners: 1926–27, 1933–34
 North Division One winners: 2006–07
 North East First Division winners: 1984–85, 1986–87, 1992–93
 Archibald Cup: 1927–28, 1929–30, 1933–34, 1976–77, 1977–78, 1978–79, 1993–94, 2016–17
 McLeman Cup: 1926–27, 1929–30, 1954–55, 1965–66
 Duthie (Acorn Heating) Cup: 1904–05, 1906–07, 1922–23, 1927–28, 1929–30, 1931–32, 1966–67
 North East League Cup: 1989–90
 Aberdeen & District Junior League Cup: 1925–26
 Morrison Trophy: 1974–75, 1998–99, 2006–07, 2012–13, 2016–17
 Aberdeen County Trophy: 1904–05, 1906–07, 1925–26, 1962–63
 Jimmy Gibb Memorial Trophy: 1986–87, 1992–93
 Martin & Johnson Trophy: 1974–75
 North Regional Cup: 2016–17, 2017–18, 2021-22

External links
Club website

References

Football clubs in Aberdeen
Football clubs in Scotland
Scottish Junior Football Association clubs
Association football clubs established in 1887
1887 establishments in Scotland
Aberdeen East End F.C.